Robert Rave is an American book author and writer.

Career
He earned his Bachelor of Fine Arts at Illinois Wesleyan University majoring in English. After graduating in 1996, he began his career as a New York City-based publicist working on numerous public relations campaigns and events in the fashion and entertainment industries.

In 2004, he moved to Los Angeles and began writing full-time. In 2009 St. Martin's Press published Spin: A Novel centered on Taylor Green, a young man from the Midwest, who stumbles into New York without a clue or a contact and later is hired by the outrageous, Jennifer Weinstein, the city's most notorious public relations diva.

Books
 (2009) Spin: A Novel, St. Martin's Press 
 (2010) Waxed, St. Martin's Press

References

External links 
 Official site
 on Facebook
 on Twitter
 Interview with ReviewFix.com on June 2010
 Review of Book "Waxed," on ReviewFix.com

Living people
1974 births
American male writers